Overbetuwe is a municipality in the province of Gelderland in the Netherlands. It was formed on 1 January 2001 as a merger of three former municipalities: Elst, Heteren and Valburg. Overbetuwe is bordered in the north by the river Rhine and in the south by the river Waal. The city hall is located in Elst, the largest town in the municipality. Together with eighteen other municipalities it forms the 'Knooppunt Arnhem-Nijmegen' (English: 'Arnhem-Nijmegen conurbation'), or simply 'KAN', which is a regional collaboration.

Towns

Transportation 
Because of its central location between the cities of Nijmegen and Arnhem, many inhabitants of Overbetuwe commute between these cities. Three major highways are situated in the municipality; the A50, A15 and A325. Overbetuwe has two railway stations: Elst and Zetten-Andelst. Besides these two existing railway lines, a controversial freight line called the Betuweroute has been operational from 2007.

Politics 
The gemeenteraad (city council) of Overbetuwe consists of 29 seats. Below is the composition of the city council since 2000:

Gallery

Notable people 

 Pieter Rijke (1812 in Hemmen – 1899) a Dutch physicist, invented the Rijke tube
 Hendrick Peter Godfried Quack (1834 in Zetten – 1917) a Dutch legal scholar, economist and historian
 Frits Kuipers (1899 in Lent – 1943) a footballer and bronze medallist at the 1920 Summer Olympics
 Jan Zwartkruis (1926 in Elst – 2013) the manager of the Netherlands national football team 1976/77 & 1978/81
 Pierre Kartner (born 1935 in Elst) a Dutch musician, singer-songwriter and record producer 
 Paul Kuypers (1939 in Elst - 1971) a Dutch agriculture expert in Ierapetra, Crete
 Johan Derksen (born 1949 in Heteren) a Dutch sports journalist and former football player
 Jeffrey Leiwakabessy (born 1981 in Elst) a Dutch former professional footballer with 403 club caps
 Loiza Lamers (born 1995 in Driel) a Dutch transgender model

References

External links

Official website

 
Municipalities of Gelderland
Municipalities of the Netherlands established in 2001